Yan Kovalevskyi (born 26 June 1993 in Zaporizhia, Ukraine) is a Ukrainian football striker. He is currently playing for Ukrainian side FC Hirnyk-Sport Komsomolsk.

Kovalevskyi is product of youth team system FC Metalurh Zaporizhzhia. Made his debut for FC Metalurh entering as a second half-time substitution playing against FC Sevastopol on 15 May 2011 in Ukrainian Premier League.

References

External links
 
 

1993 births
Living people
Ukrainian footballers
FC Metalurh Zaporizhzhia players
FC Metalurh-2 Zaporizhzhia players
Ukrainian Premier League players
Ukrainian First League players
Ukrainian Second League players
FC Hirnyk-Sport Horishni Plavni players
FC Sumy players
Association football forwards